James Hans Hamilton (February 1810 – 30 June 1863), was an Anglo-Irish Member of Parliament.

Hamilton was the son of Hans Hamilton and Anne Mitchell. He matriculated at Christ Church, Oxford on 17 June 1828. He was elected to the House of Commons for County Dublin in 1841, a seat he held until 1863. Hamilton married Caroline Trant, daughter of John Frederick Trant. He died in June 1863, aged 53. His son Ion succeeded him as Member of Parliament for County Dublin and was elevated to the peerage as Baron HolmPatrick in 1897.

A monument to him was erected in Skerries, Dublin in 1870.

Notes

References
Kidd, Charles, Williamson, David (editors). Debrett's Peerage and Baronetage (1990 edition). New York: St Martin's Press, 1990.

External links
 

1810 births
1863 deaths
Alumni of Christ Church, Oxford
Irish unionists
Members of the Parliament of the United Kingdom for County Dublin constituencies (1801–1922)
UK MPs 1841–1847
UK MPs 1847–1852
UK MPs 1852–1857
UK MPs 1857–1859
UK MPs 1859–1865
People from Castleknock